Tuwon shinkafa is a type of Nigerian and Nigerien rice swallow from Niger and the northern part of Nigeria. It is a thick pudding prepared from a local rice  that is soft and sticky, and is usually served with different types of soups like miyar kuka, miyar kubewa, and miyar taushe. Two variants made from maize and sorghum flour are called tuwon masara and tuwon dawa, respectively. In Ghana, tuwon shinkafa is called omo tuo.

See also

 Nigerian cuisine

References

Rice dishes
Porridges
Nigerian cuisine
Nigerien cuisine
Swallows (food)
Hausa cuisine